Ocinebrellus falcatus is a species of sea snail, a marine gastropod mollusk in the family Muricidae, the murex snails or rock snails.

Description

Distribution

References

 Houart, R.; Sirenko, B. I. (2003). Review of the Recent species of Ocenebra Gray, 1847 and Ocinebrellus Jousseaume, 1880 in the Northwestern Pacific. Ruthenica. 13(1): 53-74
 Liu, J.Y. [Ruiyu] (ed.). (2008). Checklist of marine biota of China seas. China Science Press. 1267 pp.

External links
 Sowerby, G. B. I; Sowerby, G. B. II. (1832-1841). The conchological illustrations or, Coloured figures of all the hitherto unfigured recent shells. London, privately published.
  Reeve, L. A. (1845-1849). Monograph of the genus Murex. In: Conchologia Iconica: or, illustrations of the shells of molluscous animals, vol. 3, pls 1-37 and unpaginated text. L. Reeve & Co., London
 Barco, A.; Herbert, G.; Houart, R.; Fassio, G. & Oliverio, M. (2017). A molecular phylogenetic framework for the subfamily Ocenebrinae (Gastropoda, Muricidae). Zoologica Scripta. 46 (3): 322-335

Ocenebrinae
Gastropods described in 1834